was a castle structure between Miyaki District, Saga and Chikushino, Fukuoka, Japan. Kii Castle has been designated a site of special national significance.

History
Kii castle was built by the Yamato court. Following the defeat of Yamato Japan in the 663 Battle of Hakusukinoe by an alliance of Tang China and the Korean kingdom of Silla, Emperor Tenji ordered the construction of defenses against a possible invasion.

Kii Castle was listed as one of the Continued Top 100 Japanese Castles in 2017.

See also
List of Historic Sites of Japan (Saga)
List of Historic Sites of Japan (Fukuoka)
List of foreign-style castles in Japan

Literature

References

Castles in Fukuoka Prefecture
Castles in Saga Prefecture
Historic Sites of Japan
Former castles in Japan
Ruined castles in Japan